Granada Club de Fútbol Femenino is a Spanish women's football club from Granada founded in 2003. It is the women's section of Granada CF.

In 2013 it was promoted to the top Spanish league for the first time. It was relegated the next year.

Competition record

Current squad

References

Women's football clubs in Spain
Granada CF
Football clubs in Andalusia
Sport in Granada
Primera División (women) clubs
Segunda Federación (women) clubs
Primera Federación (women) clubs